In June 2016, the Scotland rugby union team toured Japan, their first tour of the Eastern Asian country since 1989. Scotland went into the tour on the back of two victories and a fourth-place finish in the 2016 Six Nations Championship while Japan entered the series following an eleventh consecutive Asia Rugby Championship title, and a test match against Canada. With the Brave Blossoms new head coach Jamie Joseph not taking over until August 2016, the Sunwolves head coach Mark Hammett acted as caretaker coach for the two-test series.

Fixtures

Squads
Note: Ages, caps and clubs are as per 18 June, the first test match of the tour.

Japan
On 30 May, caretaker coach Mark Hammett named a 33-man squad for Japan's June tests against Canada and Scotland.

On 1 June, Kyosuke Horie and Shokei Kin were added to the squad for the Canadian test on 11 June.

Coaching team:
 Head coach:  Mark Hammett (Caretaker)
 Backs coach:  Atsushi Tanabe
 Forwards coach:  Filo Tiatia
 Defence coach:  Nathan Mauger

Scotland
On 9 May 2016, Vern Cotter named a 27-man squad for Scotland's June two-test series against Japan.

On 16 May, Matt Scott was called up to the squad to replace the injured Alex Dunbar.

On 19 May, Sean Lamont was called up to the squad to replace the injured Tim Visser.

On 27 May, uncapped Huw Jones was called up to the squad to replace the injured Finn Russell.

On 19 June, Gordon Reid was called up to the squad to replace the injured Alasdair Dickinson.

Coaching team:
 Head coach:  Vern Cotter
 Defence coach:  Matt Taylor
 Attack/Backs coach:  Jason O'Halloran
 Forwards coach:  Jonathan Humphreys

Matches

First test

Second test

Notes:
 Huw Jones (Scotland) made his international debut.
 The 31,392 crowd was a record home crowd for a Japanese rugby international.

Japan warm-up match
On 11 June, Japan played away to Canada in the lead up to the Scottish series.

Notes:
 Matt Heaton (Canada) and Yoshiya Hosoda, Rikiya Matsuda, Mifiposeti Paea, Yasutaka Sasakura and Kaito Shigeno (all Japan) made their international debuts.

Statistics
Key
Con: Conversions
Pen: Penalties
DG: Drop goals
Pts: Points

Scotland Statistics

Tour statistics

See also
 2016 mid-year rugby union internationals
 Mid-year rugby union tests

References

External links
 Scotland Rugby Team – the official site of the Scotland national team

2016 rugby union tours
tour
2015–16 in Japanese rugby union
2016
2016